The Cockroach that Ate Cincinnati is a Canadian film, released in 1996. Directed by Michael McNamara and starring Alan Williams, the film was an adaptation of Williams' Cockroach trilogy of one-man theatrical shows.

Synopsis 
Based on a series of plays by Alan Williams, an aging hippie and rock-fanatic-turned-stand-up-comic who calls himself ‘The Captain’ (Williams), convinces a couple of novice filmmakers (Deborah Drakeford and Oliver Dennis) to help him record his ‘pure thoughts’ – a filmic testament of his experiences and observations of the past three decades. What follows is a series of wildly complex, sardonic anecdotes and theories about rock ‘n’ roll, hero-worship, hallucinations, drugs, madness, paranoia, rebellion, nuclear dread and the search for individual integrity in a world on the brink of cultural and physical destruction.

The title references the 1973 novelty song "The Cockroach That Ate Cincinnati", by Rose and the Arrangement (a.k.a. Possum).

Cast
 Alan Williams as The Captain
 Deborah Drakeford as Novice filmmaker
 Oliver Dennis as Novice filmmaker
 Diane Niac
 Peter Steponaitis
 Danielle Pedard
 Michael Olesen

Reception
The film garnered Williams a Genie Award nomination for Best Actor at the 18th Genie Awards.

References

External links 
 

1996 films
Canadian comedy films
English-language Canadian films
Films based on Canadian plays
1990s English-language films
1990s Canadian films